Laure de La Raudière (born 12 February 1965) is a French politician of Agir who has been serving chair of the Regulatory Authority for Electronic Communications, Postal and Print Media Distribution (ARCEP) since 2021. From 2007 until 2021, she was a member of the National Assembly of France, representing the Eure-et-Loir department.

Political career
From 2015 until 2017, De La Raudière was a member of The Republicans. Following the 2017 legislative election, she stood as a candidate for the National Assembly's presidency; in the vote, she lost against François de Rugy.

In parliament, De La Raudière served on the Committee on Economic Affairs. In addition to her committee assignments, she was a member of the French-Estonian Parliamentary Friendship Group and the French-Irish Parliamentary Friendship Group.

In November 2017, De La Raudière co-founded Agir. Under the leadership of party chairman Franck Riester, she has since been serving as deputy chair alongside Frédéric Lefebvre, Fabienne Keller and Claude Malhuret.

Chair of ARCEP
In January 2021, De la Raudière was nominated by President Emmanuel Macron as chairwoman of the Regulatory Authority for Electronic Communications, Postal and Print Media Distribution (ARCEP).

Political positions
In the Republicans’ 2016 presidential primaries, De La Raudière endorsed Bruno Le Maire as the party's candidate for the office of President of France.

In 2018, De La Raudière voted for the use of Glyphosate in cultural process in France.

References

External links
Official website
Parliamentary activities

1965 births
Living people
People from Neuilly-sur-Seine
Politicians from Île-de-France
Deputies of Eure-et-Loir
Union for a Popular Movement politicians
The Republicans (France) politicians
Agir (France) politicians
Deputies of the 13th National Assembly of the French Fifth Republic
Deputies of the 14th National Assembly of the French Fifth Republic
Deputies of the 15th National Assembly of the French Fifth Republic
Women members of the National Assembly (France)
21st-century French women politicians
École Normale Supérieure alumni
Télécom Paris alumni
Corps des télécommunications
Corps des mines